Danie Coetzee (born 2 September 1977 in Harrismith, South Africa) is a South African rugby union footballer. His usual position is at hooker, and he has played for the Springboks. He played for the Bulls in the international Super 12 competition as well as the Blue Bulls in the Currie Cup, and played for London Irish for five seasons between 2005 and 2010, retiring in 2010.

Coetzee made his international debut for South Africa on 6 July 2002 in a match against Samoa at Loftus Versfeld in Pretoria, which the Springboks won 60-18.

In June 2003 he played in two tests against the Scottish in South Africa, which were both won by the Springboks. He subsequently played in the following test against Argentina in Port Elizabeth in which he scored a try.

After playing in the 2003 Tri Nations Series against Australia and the All Blacks, he was included in the Springboks 2003 Rugby World Cup squad. He then played in four World Cup matches in Australia. He played in two end-of-year tests in 2004, against Scotland and Argentina. He was included in the Springboks' 2006 Tri Nations Series squad.

Title=Child rudolf coetzee

References

External links
London Irish profile
Danie Coetzee on rwc2003.irb.com
Danie Coetzee on genslin.us

1977 births
Living people
People from Harrismith
Afrikaner people
South African people of Dutch descent
London Irish players
South African rugby union players
South Africa international rugby union players
Rugby union hookers
Bulls (rugby union) players
Blue Bulls players
Rugby union players from the Free State (province)